Houston Public Schools is a school district headquartered in Houston, Minnesota, United States.

The district serves Houston and some unincorporated areas in Houston County.

Schools
The district has two schools named Houston Elementary School and  Houston High School; both are in Houston.

External links
 Houston Public Schools

School districts in Minnesota
Education in Houston County, Minnesota